is a Japanese short-track speed skater, who won a bronze medal in the 5000 m relay at the 1992 Winter Olympics together with teammates Yuichi Akasaka, Toshinobu Kawai and Tsutomu Kawasaki.

References

External links
 
 Tatsuyoshi Ishihara at ISU
 Tatsuyoshi Ishihara at the-sports.org

1964 births
Living people
Japanese male short track speed skaters
Olympic short track speed skaters of Japan
Olympic medalists in short track speed skating
Olympic bronze medalists for Japan
Short track speed skaters at the 1988 Winter Olympics
Short track speed skaters at the 1992 Winter Olympics
Short track speed skaters at the 1994 Winter Olympics
Medalists at the 1992 Winter Olympics
Asian Games medalists in short track speed skating
Asian Games silver medalists for Japan
Short track speed skaters at the 1986 Asian Winter Games
Medalists at the 1986 Asian Winter Games
20th-century Japanese people